NASCAR Racing 2 is a video game developed by Papyrus Design Group and published by Sierra On-Line for Microsoft Windows and MS-DOS in late 1996.

Gameplay 
NASCAR Racing 2 improved upon its predecessor by introducing a new game engine. This improved the graphics, physics, sound, and multiplayer. 

This game is notable as being the first NASCAR game to have 3D Acceleration: 3Dfx Acceleration through DOS, and Rendition through Windows.

Reception 
The game has an average review ranking of 69% on GameRankings, with a mixture of scores from critics.

Next Generation reviewed the PC version of the game, rating it three stars out of five, and stated that "as a whole, NASCAR Racing 2 is a solid example of what a racing game should be".

NASCAR Racing 2 won Computer Games Strategy Pluss 1996 "Racing Simulation" of the year award. It was a runner-up for Computer Game Entertainments 1996 "Best Sports Game" prize, which ultimately went to Links LS 1997. The game was a finalist for Computer Gaming Worlds 1996 "Sports Game of the Year" award, which ultimately went to NBA Live 97. However, it won the magazine's Readers' Choice award in the category.

NASCAR Racing 2 was named the 42nd best computer game ever by PC Gamer UK in 1997.

NASCAR Racing 2 was a commercial hit. According to PC Data, the game was the United States' 19th-best-selling computer game during the January-November 1998 period. NASCAR Racing 2 and its predecessor shipped above 2 million copies globally by March 1998. According to Gord Goble of GameSpot, the game alone reached global sales of 800,000 units by 2004, making it the second-biggest Papyrus hit as of that year.

References

External links 
NASCAR Racing 2 at MobyGames

1996 video games
DOS games
NASCAR video games
Papyrus Design Group games
Racing simulators
Racing video games
Video games developed in the United States
Windows games
Sierra Entertainment games